Bajram Curri Boulevard is a major boulevard of Tirana, Albania. It runs in a west–east direction and crosses the city centre south of the central Skanderbeg Square. At Rinia Park it intersects with Dëshmorët e Kombit Boulevard just south of the square. Towards the east it branches off into Ali Demi Street. In the past, it held the name Shqiperia e Re. The boulevard, along with Zhan D'Ark Boulevard, underwent reconstruction in 2003.

See also

 Landmarks in Tirana
 Architecture of Albania

References

Streets in Tirana
Buildings and structures in Tirana
Squares in Albania
Tourist attractions in Tirana